Newberry Township is one of the twelve townships of Miami County, Ohio, United States.  The 2000 census found 6,490 people in the township, 2,897 of whom lived in the unincorporated portions of the township.

Geography
Located in the northwestern corner of the county, it borders the following townships:
Loramie Township, Shelby County – north
Washington Township – east
Newton Township – south
Franklin Township, Darke County – southwest corner
Adams Township, Darke County – west
Wayne Township, Darke County – northwest corner

Two incorporated villages are located in Newberry Township: part of Bradford in the west, and Covington in the southeast.

Name and history
Newberry Township was organized around 1810. It is the only Newberry Township statewide.

Government

The township is governed by a three-member board of trustees, who are elected in November of odd-numbered years to a four-year term beginning on the following January 1. Two are elected in the year after the presidential election and one is elected in the year before it. There is also an elected township fiscal officer, who serves a four-year term beginning on April 1 of the year after the election, which is held in November of the year before the presidential election. Vacancies in the fiscal officership or on the board of trustees are filled by the remaining trustees.

References

External links
County website

Townships in Miami County, Ohio
Townships in Ohio